Nikolai Kovsh (born 22 January 1965) is a cyclist from  Soviet Union. He competed for the Soviet Union in the 1988 Summer Olympics held in Seoul, South Korea in the individual sprint event where he finished in second place. He also competed for the Unified Team at the 1992 Summer Olympics.

References

1965 births
Living people
Russian male cyclists
Soviet male cyclists
Olympic cyclists of the Soviet Union
Olympic cyclists of the Unified Team
Olympic silver medalists for the Soviet Union
Cyclists at the 1988 Summer Olympics
Cyclists at the 1992 Summer Olympics
Olympic medalists in cycling
Cyclists from Moscow
Medalists at the 1988 Summer Olympics